Sharana Air Base  is a public use airport located near Sharana, Paktika, Afghanistan.

Airlines and destinations
Currently there are no airlines operating at Sharana Air Base.

See also
List of airports in Afghanistan

References

External links 
 Airport record for Sharana Airstrip at Landings.com.

Airports in Afghanistan
Paktika Province